This is a list of the States of India ranked in order of percentage of people having a Body Mass Index lower than normal. The information is based on the Demographic & Health Survey of 2005–06 for India.

People with low Body Mass Index (BMI)

References
 www.measuredhs.com/publications/publication-frind3-dhs-final-reports.cfm

States and union territories of India-related lists
Lists of subdivisions of India
Human body weight